The 18th Hollywood Film Awards were held on November 14, 2014, and aired on CBS. The ceremony took place at the Hollywood Palladium in Los Angeles, California.

Winners 
 Hollywood Career Achievement Award: Michael Keaton
 Hollywood Film Award: Gone Girl (accepted by Ben Affleck)
 Hollywood Director Award: Morten Tyldum for The Imitation Game
 Hollywood Actor Award: Benedict Cumberbatch for The Imitation Game
 Hollywood Actress Award: Julianne Moore for Still Alice
 Hollywood Supporting Actor Award: Robert Duvall for The Judge
 Hollywood Supporting Actress Award: Keira Knightley for The Imitation Game
 Hollywood Ensemble Award: Foxcatcher (Steve Carell, Channing Tatum, Mark Ruffalo)
 Hollywood Breakout Performance Actress Award: Shailene Woodley for The Fault in Our Stars
 Hollywood Breakout Performance Actor Award: Eddie Redmayne for The Theory of Everything
 Hollywood Breakthrough Director Award: Jean-Marc Vallée for Wild
 New Hollywood Award: Jack O'Connell
 Hollywood Screenwriter Award: Gillian Flynn for Gone Girl
 Hollywood Song Award: "What Is Love" from Rio 2 (accepted and performed by Janelle Monáe)
 Hollywood Animation Award: How to Train Your Dragon 2
 Hollywood Blockbuster Award: Guardians of the Galaxy
 Hollywood Documentary Award: Mike Myers for Supermensch: The Legend of Shep Gordon
 Hollywood Comedy Film Award: Chris Rock for Top Five
 Hollywood International Award: Jing Tian
 Hollywood Cinematography Award: Emmanuel Lubezki for Birdman
 Hollywood Visual Effects Award: Scott Farrar for Transformers: Age of Extinction
 Hollywood Film Composer Award: Alexandre Desplat for The Imitation Game
 Hollywood Costume Design Award: Milena Canonero for The Grand Budapest Hotel
 Hollywood Editing Award: Jay Cassidy and Dody Dorn for Fury
 Hollywood Production Design Award: Dylan Cole and Gary Freeman for Maleficent
 Hollywood Sound Award: Ren Klyce for Gone Girl
 Hollywood Make-Up and Hairstyling Award: David White (Special Make-Up Effects) and Elizabeth Yianni-Georgiou (Hair Designer and Make-Up Designer) for Guardians of the Galaxy

References

External links
 

Hollywood
2014 in California
Hollywood Film Awards
2014 in American cinema